Turricula is a genus of sea snails, marine gastropod mollusks in the family Clavatulidae.

Taxonomy
Clavatulidae was raised, based on cladistic analysis, from subfamily to the family level by Rosenberg in 1998. It remained regarded as a subfamily of Turridae by several malacologists (Kantor, Sysoev). until a new publication in 2011

Fossil records
This genus is known in the fossil records from the Cretaceous to the Quaternary (age range: from 70.6 to 0.0 million years ago). Fossils of species within this genus have been found all over the world.

Description
The turriculated shell is fusiform with a long spire. The anal sinus is situated in the infrasutural depression above the peripheral carina. The siphonal canal is long and slightly bent. The operculum has a medio-lateral nucleus. The eyes of the animal are situated at the base of the tentacles. Radula formula : 1-0-1.

Distribution
The species of this marine genus occurs in the Indo-West Pacific, from the Red Sea and east Africa to Australia (Northern Territory, Queensland, Western Australia).

Species
 

Species within the genusTurricula  include:

 Turricula aethiopica (Thiele, 1925)
 Turricula amplisulcus (Barnard, 1958)
 † Turricula beamensis M.A. Peyrot, 1925
 † Turricula belgica (G.G. Münster, 1826)
 † Turricula beyrichi (R.A. Philippi, 1846)
 † Turricula brevicauda (Deshayes, 1834)
 Turricula ceylonica (Smith E. A., 1877)
 Turricula faurei (Barnard, 1958)
 Turricula gemmulaeformis (Thiele, 1925)
 Turricula granobalteus (Hedley, 1922)
 Turricula javana (Linnaeus, 1767)
 Turricula navarchus (Melvill & Standen, 1903)
 Turricula nelliae (Smith E. A., 1877)
 Turricula panthea Dall, 1919
 Turricula profundorum (Smith E. A., 1896)
 Turricula sulcicancellata (Barnard, 1958)
 Turricula sumatrana (Thiele, 1925)
 Turricula thurstoni (Smith E. A., 1896)
 Turricula tornata (Dillwyn, 1817)
 Turricula turriplana (Sowerby III, 1903)
 † Turricula dimidiata Brocchi, 1814
 † Turricula eolavinia Olsson, 1930
 † Turricula excelsa Bohm, 1926
 † Turricula hanguensis Cox, 1930
 † Turricula haydeni Cox, 1930
 † Turricula kayalensis Dey, 1961
 † Turricula promensis silistrensis Vredenburg, 1921
 † Turricula promensis Vredenburg, 1921
 † Turricula sethuramae Vredenburg, 1921
 † Turricula spuria Hedley, 1922
 † Turricula taurina Olsson, 1922
 † Turricula terryi Olsson, 1922
 † Turricula thangaensis Vredenburg, 1921
 † Turricula wanneri (Tesch, 1915)

Species brought into synonymy
 Turricula bijubata (Reeve, 1843): synonym of Turridrupa bijubata (Reeve, 1843)
 Turricula brunonia Dall, 1924: synonym of Veprecula brunonia (Dall, 1924)
 Turricula cadaverosa (Reeve, 1844): synonym of Vexillum cadaverosum (Reeve, 1844)
 Turricula casta H. Adams, 1872: synonym of Vexillum castum (H. Adams, 1872)
 Turricula ensyuensis Shikama, 1977: synonym of Comitas ensyuensis (Shikama, 1977)
 Turricula flammea Schumacher, 1817: synonym of Turricula javana (Linnaeus, 1767)
 Turricula granobalteatus [sic]: synonym of Turricula granobalteus (Hedley, 1922)
 Turricula hondoana Dall, 1925: synonym of Aforia circinata (Dall, 1873)
 Turricula kamakurana (Pilsbry, 1895): synonym of Comitas kamakurana (Pilsbry, 1895)
 Turricula kuroharai Oyama, 1962: synonym of Comitas kuroharai (Oyama, 1962)
 Turricula lavinia Dall, 1919: synonym of Ptychobela lavinia (Dall, 1919)
 Turricula lavinoides Olsson, 1922: synonym of Fusiturricula lavinoides (Olsson, 1922)
 Turricula libya Dall, 1919: synonym of Tiariturris libya (Dall, 1919)
 Turricula limonensis Olsson, 1922: synonym of Fusiturricula lavinoides (Olsson, 1922)
 Turricula murrawolga Garrard, 1961: synonym of Comitas murrawolga (Garrard, 1961)
 Turricula rectilateralis (G.B. Sowerby II, 1874): synonym of Vexillum suluense (A. Adams & Reeve, 1850)
 Turricula scalaria (Barnard, 1958): synonym of Makiyamaia scalaria (Barnard, 1958)
 Turricula tornatus [sic]: synonym of Turricula tornata (Dillwyn, 1817)
 Turricula tuberculata (Gray, 1839): synonym of Turricula nelliae spuria (Hedley, 1922)
 † Turricula waitaraensis Marwick, 1926: synonym of † Thatcheria waitaraensis (Marwick, 1926)
Taxa inquirenda - further investigation needed
 Turricula catena 
 Surcula aditus Barnard, 1969
 Surcula bouvieri Jousseaume, 1898
 Surcula urnula Thiele, 1925

References

 Nomenclaturor Zoologicus info
 Li, BQ. & Li, XZ. 2008. Report on the two subfamilies Clavatulinae and Cochlespirinae (Mollusca : Neogastropoda : Turridae) from the China seas. Zootaxa 1771: 31-42 
 Wilson, B. 1994. Australian Marine Shells. Prosobranch Gastropods. Kallaroo, WA : Odyssey Publishing Vol. 2 370 pp.

External links
 Worldwide Mollusc Species Data Base: Clavatulidae

 
Extant Maastrichtian first appearances